Beldam may refer to:

The Beldam, the main antagonist of Neil Gaiman's dark fantasy novella Coraline and its subsequent film adaptation
 Beldam, a character from Paper Mario: The Thousand-Year Door

People
The Beldam Painter (active circa 470 to before 450 BC), Greek black-figure vase painter
George Beldam (1868–1937), English cricketer and photographer
George Beldam, alias Rex Bell (1903–1962), American actor and politician
Joseph Beldam (1795–1866), English writer, historian and advocate of the abolition of slavery

See also
Beldame (1901–1924), an American racehorse and broodmare
La Belle Dame sans Merci, a ballad by English poet John Keats